Odostomia nardoi is a species of sea snail, a marine gastropod mollusc in the family Pyramidellidae, the pyrams and their allies.

Description
The shell grows to a length of 1.6 mm.

Distribution
This species occurs in the following locations:
 Greek Exclusive Economic Zone
 Portuguese Exclusive Economic Zone
 Spanish Exclusive Economic Zone
 the Black Sea

References

External links
 To Biodiversity Heritage Library (1 publication)
 To Encyclopedia of Life
 To World Register of Marine Species

nardoi
Gastropods described in 1869